Standings and results for Group B of the Regular Season phase of the 2006-07 Euroleague basketball tournament.

Tiebreakers:
Head-to-head record in matches between the tied clubs
Overall point difference in games between the tied clubs
Overall point difference in all group matches (first tiebreaker if tied clubs are not in the same group)
Points scored in all group matches
Sum of quotients of points scored and points allowed in each group match

Standings

Notes:
Joventut finish third, ahead of Unicaja, based on a head-to-head sweep.
The three-way tie between Lottomatica, Partizan and Cibona for fifth through seventh places goes to the second tiebreaker of point difference in head-to-head matches because all three teams split their group matches against one another. Lottomatica win the tiebreaker and earn the automatic Top 16 berth with a head-to-head point difference of +11. Partizan's -3 is good for sixth place and a possible Top 16 berth (see below), and Cibona are eliminated from Top 16 contention at -8.
Partizan finish level with Eldo Napoli in Group C for the best sixth-place record. Partizan win the tiebreaker with an overall points difference in group play of +7 to Eldo's -61.

Fixtures and results
* = Overtime (one star per overtime period)

Game 1, October 24–26, 2006

Game 2, November 1–2, 2006

Game 3, November 8–9, 2006

Game 4, November 15–16, 2006

Game 5, November 22–23, 2006

Game 6, November 29–30, 2006

Game 7, December 6–7, 2006

Game 8, December 13–14, 2006

Game 9, December 20–21, 2006

Game 10, January 3–4, 2007

Game 11, January 10–11, 2007

Game 12, January 17–18, 2007

Game 13, January 24–25, 2007

Game 14, January 31 - February 1, 2007

Notes and references

Group B
2006–07 in Spanish basketball
2006–07 in Israeli basketball
2006–07 in Slovenian basketball
2006–07 in Greek basketball
2006–07 in Italian basketball
2006–07 in Croatian basketball
2006–07 in Serbian basketball